Junior Paulo (born 20 November 1993) is a Samoa international rugby league footballer who plays as a  for the Parramatta Eels in the NRL.

He previously played for the Canberra Raiders and Parramatta in the National Rugby League. Paulo has also represented New South Wales in the State of Origin series.

Background
Paulo was born in Auckland, New Zealand. He is of Samoan descent, with family links to Safotu.

He played his junior football for the Ashcroft Stallions and the Cabramatta Two Blues, and attended renowned rugby league school Ashcroft High School before being signed by the Parramatta Eels. Paulo played for the Eels NYC team in 2012 and 2013. In 2011, Paulo played for the Australian Schoolboys. On 20 April 2013, Paulo played for the New South Wales U20's team off the interchange bench in the 36–12 win over Queensland at Penrith Stadium.

Playing career

2013

In Round 10 of the 2013 NRL season, Paulo made his NRL debut for the Parramatta Eels against the St George Illawarra Dragons off the interchange bench in the Eels 32–12 loss at WIN Stadium. On 5 July 2013, Paulo extended his contract with the Eels for a further 3 years till the end of the 2016 season. In Round 22 against the Wests Tigers, Paulo scored his first NRL career try in the Eels 26–22 win at Parramatta Stadium. Paulo finished his debut year in the NRL with him playing in 11 matches and scoring a try for the Parramatta Eels in the 2013 NRL season.

2014
In May 2014, Paulo was selected for the Samoa national rugby league team to play against Fiji in the 2014 Pacific Rugby League International but was replaced by Carlos Tuimavave. 

Paulo finished off the 2014 NRL season with him playing in 16 matches and scoring a try for the Parramatta Eels. 

On 8 September 2014, Paulo was named in the Samoa train-on squad for the 2014 Four Nations, but later didn't make the final 24-man squad.

2015
On 31 January and 1 February, Paulo played for Parramatta in the 2015 NRL Auckland Nines. 

In Round 1 against the Manly Warringah Sea Eagles, he received a 9-week suspension for his high tackle on Sea Eagles hooker Matt Ballin in the Eels' 42–12 win at Parramatta Stadium. Paulo made his return to the Eels team in Round 11 against the South Sydney Rabbitohs in the Eels' 14–12 loss at ANZ Stadium. He finished off the 2015 season having played in 15 matches and scoring 2 tries for Parramatta. 

On 29 September, he was involved in a road rage incident with a 28-year-old man on the M4 Western Motorway, Paulo was accused of tailgating the other driver before punching him in the face and driving away from the scene after the pair pulled over after both of their vehicles collided with each other. Paulo was later charged with common assault, recklessly damaging property and menacing driving. Paulo will plead not guilty to the charges in court in October 2016.

2016
In February 2016, Paulo played for Parramatta in their 2016 NRL Auckland Nines winning tournament. 

On 14 March 2016, Paulo signed a 2-year contract with the Canberra Raiders starting in 2017. 

On 7 May 2016, Paulo made his international debut for Samoa against Tonga in the 2016 Polynesian Cup. 

May 2016 was a turbulent month for Paulo, first he made a cameo for a third-grade Rugby Union team, Oatley, saying that his brother-in-law who is the coach of team wanted him to fill in the team and Paulo did as a favour, signing under a fake name and worn headgear in an attempt to hope that nobody would recognise him. After the bizarre Rugby cameo, Paulo alongside Corey Norman, and Panthers hooker James Segeyaro were issued with warnings from NSW police for consorting with convicted criminals. On 29 May 2016, he was released effectively immediately from his Parramatta contract to join Canberra early.

In Round 13, Paulo made his club debut for Canberra against the Manly Warringah Sea Eagles, where he started at prop in the 30–18 win at Canberra Stadium. Paulo would go on to play in 13 matches for the Raiders for the rest of the 2016 NRL season. On 26 September 2016, Paulo was named in the 2016 Australia Kangaroos train-on squad for the 2016 Four Nations but later didn't make the final 24-man squad. 

On 8 October 2016, Paulo played for Samoa against Fiji, starting at prop in the 20–18 loss in Apia, Samoa. 

On 8 December 2016, Paulo participated in the Ladbrokes Star of the Ring Charity Fight Night at the Hordern Pavilion, where he went up against Cronulla-Sutherland Sharks captain Paul Gallen but lost in a unanimous decision.

2017
On 7 February 2017, Paulo was suspended by the NRL integrity unit following his common assault and reckless driving convictions he received in 2016. 

He was banned for round 1 in the Raiders season opener against the North Queensland Cowboys, participating in the Auckland Nines tournament and being selected in the World All Stars team. 

On 6 May 2017, Paulo played for Samoa in the test against England, starting at prop in the 30–10 loss at Campbelltown Stadium. 

In Round 25 against the Newcastle Knights, Paulo scored his first club try for the Raiders in the 46–28 win at Canberra Stadium. Paulo finished the 2017 NRL season with him playing in 23 matches and scoring 1 try for the Raiders. On 11 September 2017, Paulo was awarded with the Mal Meninga Medal for being the Raiders Player of the Year. 

On 6 October 2017, Paulo was selected in the 24-man squad for Samoa in the 2017 Rugby League World Cup. In Samoa's third pool match against Scotland, Paulo scored his first international try for Samoa in the 14–14 all draw at Barlow Park in Cairns. Paulo played in all 4 matches, starting at prop and scored 1 try in Samoa's disappointing campaign.

2018
On 19 April 2018, Paulo signed a four-year deal to rejoin Parramatta at the end of the season on a deal worth $2.8 million.

2019
Paulo marked his return to Parramatta in Round 2 against arch rivals Canterbury-Bankstown which ended in a 36–16 victory.

Paulo made a total of 24 appearances for Parramatta in the 2019 NRL season as the club finished 5th on the table and qualified for the finals.  Paulo played in both of the club's finals matches as they were eliminated in the second week by Melbourne losing 32–0 at AAMI Park.

2020
In round 18 of the 2020 NRL season, Paulo played his 150th first grade game which ended in a 20-2 defeat against Penrith at Penrith Park.

After a good season for Parramatta, Paulo was selected by New South Wales for the 2020 State of Origin series.  Paulo played all three games as New South Wales suffered a shock 2-1 series defeat against Queensland.

2021
In round 1 of the 2021 NRL season, Paulo scored the winning try in Parramatta's 24-16 victory over Brisbane.

On 30 May, he was selected for game one of the 2021 State of Origin series.

On 21 June, he was selected as one of the two starting props in the 2021 State of Origin series.

In Parramatta’s semifinal against Penrith, with Penrith leading 8–6 with less than one minute on the clock, Paulo dropped the ball just out in front of Penrith’s try line effectively ending Parramatta’s season.
On 17 December, Paulo signed a new four-year deal with Parramatta to remain at the club until the end of the 2026 season.

2022
In round 5 of the 2022 NRL season, Paulo was sent to the sin bin for a high tackle on Gold Coast's Alexander Brimson during Parramatta's 26-20 victory. Paulo was subsequently banned for one match.

On 29 May, Paulo was selected by New South Wales to play in game one of the 2022 State of Origin series. Paulo played in all three matches of the series which saw Queensland win 2-1.

Paulo played 26 games for Parramatta in the 2022 season including the clubs Grand Final loss to Penrith.

In October Paulo was named in the Samoa squad for the 2021 Rugby League World Cup.

Paulo played every game for Samoa at the tournament including the final where they were beaten 30-10 by Australia. Paulo became the first player in history to be on the losing side in the State of Origin deciding match, the NRL Grand final and the Rugby League World Cup final during a calendar year.

In November he was named in the 2021 RLWC Team of the Tournament.

Professional Boxing Record

| style="text-align:center;" colspan=8|0 Wins, 1 Loss, 0 Draws
|-  style="text-align:center; background:#e3e3e3;"
|  style="border-style:none none solid solid; "|Res.
|  style="border-style:none none solid solid; "|Record
|  style="border-style:none none solid solid; "|Opponent
|  style="border-style:none none solid solid; "|Type
|  style="border-style:none none solid solid; "|Rd., Time
|  style="border-style:none none solid solid; "|Date
|  style="border-style:none none solid solid; "|Location
|  style="border-style:none none solid solid; "|Notes
|- align=center
|Loss
| 0–1||align=left| Paul Gallen
|
|
|
|align=left|
|align=left|

References

External links

Parramatta Eels profile
Canberra Raiders profile
Raiders profile
NRL profile
2017 RLWC profile
Samoa profile

1993 births
Living people
Cabramatta Two Blues players
Canberra Raiders players
Junior Kangaroos players
New Zealand emigrants to Australia
New Zealand sportspeople of Samoan descent
New Zealand rugby league players
Parramatta Eels players
New South Wales Rugby League State of Origin players
Rugby league players from Auckland
Rugby league props
Samoa national rugby league team players
Wentworthville Magpies players